Murilo Maccari (born 21 September 1987) is a Brazilian professional footballer, who plays for Naxxar Lions F.C. in Malta.

Position 
He plays the position of midfielder.

Career 
His former clubs include Sport Club Internacional, Figueirense Futebol Clube, Reggina Calcio, NK Domžale and Vittoriosa Stars F.C. Murilo also holds an Italian passport.

Honours

Club
 JK Nõmme Kalju
 Estonian Cup
 Runners Up: 2008–09

External links
 CBF 
 JK Nõmme Kalju profile 
 

1987 births
Living people
Brazilian footballers
Brazilian expatriate footballers
Sport Club Internacional players
Figueirense FC players
Reggina 1914 players
NK Domžale players
Nõmme Kalju FC players
Expatriate footballers in Estonia
Expatriate footballers in Italy
Expatriate footballers in Slovenia
Association football midfielders
Brazilian people of Italian descent
Expatriate footballers in Malta
Meistriliiga players
Brazilian expatriate sportspeople in Estonia
Brazilian expatriate sportspeople in Italy
Brazilian expatriate sportspeople in Malta
Brazilian expatriate sportspeople in Slovenia